Jhanak Jhanak Payal Baaje is a 1955 Indian Hindi-language dance film directed by V. Shantaram. It stars Shantaram's wife Sandhya and dancer Gopi Krishna in lead roles. One of the earlier Technicolor films made in India, the film won the All India Certificate of Merit for Best Feature Film, the National Film Award for Best Feature Film in Hindi, and the Filmfare Best Movie Award. The film was declared a "Super Hit" at Box office India.

Cast

 Sandhya as Neela
 Gopi Krishna as Girdhar
 Keshavrao Date as Mangal Maharaj
 Madan Puri as Manilal
 Manorama as Bindiya
 Chandrakanta
 Mumtaz Begum as Roopkala's mom
 Chowbe Maharaj
 Nana Palsikar as the Sadhu
 Nimbalkar
 Bhagwan as Badlu

Plot
Classical dance guru Mangal stumbles on a dance performance in a lavish haveli by Neela. He orders his talented son Girdhar to demonstrate to the audience the true method of classical dance. Entranced by Girdhar's skill, Neela begs Mangal to admit her as a pupil. He finally agrees on two conditions: she must devote her life to art and she must partner Girdhar in the Tandav portion of an upcoming dance competition. As the two practice together, she begins to fall in love with Girdhar. Manilal, a wealthy and jealous man who hopes to have Neela for himself, warns Mangal that the two are falling in love, but he ignores him. When Mangal goes away for some time to buy new costumes for the pair, they confess their love to each other and neglect their dancing in favor of idyllic walks and boat rides. Mangal returns and discovers that the two are in love. Enraged that Girdhar's dancing has suffered and believing that he will now never win the title of Bharat Natarajan, he renounces his son and resolves to leave him. Dismayed that she has endangered Girdhar's career, Neela pretends that she has betrayed him with Manilal and he returns to his father and his art. The devastated Neela tries to drown herself in the river, but is rescued by a kindly sadhu. She decides to follow the example of the minstrel Meerabai and devotes her life to Krishna, but is alarmed when Girdhar appears, declaring that he can not forget her. She pretends not to know him and he is enraged; his father takes him away. She becomes ill and the sadhu and her servant Bindiya take her to the temple where the dance competition is being held. Hoping to sabotage his chances, Manilal has bribed Girdhar's new partner to drop out of the competition. Neela takes her place in the Tandav dance and Mangal realizes that she spurned Girdhar to help him win the competition. He then convinces his son to give her a second chance. With the help of Neela, Girdhar wins the competition and Mangal gives the couple his blessing to marry.

Music
Vasant Desai composed the music and Hasrat Jaipuri wrote the lyrics for the film. The song "Jo Tum Todo Piya", inspired by Meerabai was later also used for the 1981 film Silsila. Shivkumar Sharma, the Padma Shri and Padma Vibhushan recipient musician has played Santoor in this film. Santoor was used for the first time in Indian Cinema.

The voice of Asha Bhosle was used in a few lines, which was not available on records, but only on the film soundtrack.

Awards
3rd National Film Awards (1955)
All India Certificate of Merit for Best Feature Film
Best Feature Film in Hindi

4th Filmfare Awards (1956)
Filmfare Award for Best Film
Filmfare Award for Best Director for V. Shantaram
Filmfare Award for Best Art Direction for Kanu Desai
Filmfare Award for Best Sound Design for A. K. Parmar

References

External links 
 
 Jhanak Jhanak Payal Baaje  - A study UIO

1955 films
1950s Hindi-language films
Films directed by V. Shantaram
Indian dance films
Indian epic films
Best Hindi Feature Film National Film Award winners